The Greensburg Jeannette Regional Airport  is a privately owned, public use airport which is located three nautical miles (6 km) north of the central business district of Jeannette, a city in Westmoreland County, Pennsylvania, United States. 

This airport was included in the National Plan of Integrated Airport Systems for 2009–2013, which categorized it as a general aviation facility.

Facilities and aircraft 
Greensburg Jeannette Regional Airport covers an area of 121 acres (49 ha) at an elevation of 1,188 feet (362 m) above mean sea level. It has one runway designated 2/20 with an asphalt surface measuring 2,605 by 50 feet (794 x 15 m).

For the twelve-month period ending November 22, 2011, the airport had 4,499 aircraft operations, an average of 12 per day: 98% general aviation and 2% military.
At that time, there were five aircraft based at this airport: 80% single-engine and 20% helicopter.

References

External links 
 Greensburg-Jeannette Regional Airport (5G8) at Pennsylvania DOT Bureau of Aviation
 Aerial image as of April 1993 from USGS The National Map

Airports in Pennsylvania
Transportation buildings and structures in Westmoreland County, Pennsylvania
Privately owned airports